Past Master is a science fiction novel by American writer R. A. Lafferty, first published in 1968. The novel follows the attempt of a future Utopian society in preventing its decline, by bringing  Sir Thomas More to the year 2535.

The novel was well received by critics, and was nominated for the 1968 Nebula Award and the 1969 Hugo Award. It is generally categorized as part of the New Wave of science fiction.

Plot introduction

Past Master is set in the year 2535 on the world of Astrobe, a utopian Earth colony that is hailed as Golden Astrobe, "mankind's third chance", after the decline of both the Old World and New World on Earth. Despite idealistic intentions, it is suffering moral and social decline that may be terminal for both Astrobe and the human race.

In an attempt to save their dying civilization, its leaders use time travel to fetch Sir Thomas More (chosen for his fine legal and moral sense) from shortly before his death in the year 1535 to be the president of Astrobe. More struggles with whether to approve of the Astrobian society, noting its possible connections to his own novel Utopia. His judgements soon lead him into conflict both with destructive cosmic forces on Astrobe and with its leaders who thought him a mere figurehead who could be manipulated.

Reception

The novel was generally well received by critics who praised both its style and story telling. R. D. Mullen commented that "The prose style is Besterian and page by page a joy to read, but the narrative technique is Vanvogtian not only in being pyrotechnic but also in being indifferent to causal consistency, and this is perhaps not the best technique for the theme." Judith Merril praised Past Master as "a complex, subtle, colorful, and highly sophisticated book", saying that "Lafferty magics me with humor, anger, and love, and with unpredictable corner-of-the-eye perspectives and perceptions, but above all, I suspect, with his word-music."

Algis Budrys criticized the book for not being longer because it did not depict More's thoughts, but concluded "It is good to see this kind of thing being written". P. Schuyler Miller declared the novel showed Lafferty "writing like the heir to 'Cordwainer Smith', yet always completely himself -- more macabre, more cryptic, with more of the humor of the incongruous [that] Samuel R. Delany calls 'ultraviolet' on the cover." Alexei Panshin found Past Master "an eccentric, idiosyncratic minor masterpiece", saying "it has all of Lafferty's usual color and pyramiding of manic invention" as well as offering "easily the most real immediate problem of spiritual agony yet seen in science fiction".

References

External links

 "Past Master" - a review by Bill McClain at watershade.net
 "Past Master by R. A. Lafferty", a review at the MPorcius Fiction Log

1968 American novels
1968 science fiction novels
American science fiction novels
Cultural depictions of Thomas More
Ace Books books
Works by R. A. Lafferty